East Indian people is a demonym that is used in North America to refer to:
 people from the Indian subcontinent, i.e., the South Asian ethnic groups, or
 Indo-Caribbean, Caribbean people with roots in India
 people from India, Indian people

Older uses
 people from the Maritime Southeast Asia
 people of mixed European and Asian (esp. Indian) parentage

Other uses
 People from Eastern parts of India
 East Indian Catholics, based in and around the city of Mumbai

See also
 East India (disambiguation)